Twilight of the Idols (In Conspiracy with Satan) is the sixth studio album by Norwegian black metal band Gorgoroth. It was released on 12 August 2003 by Nuclear Blast and reissued in 2006 by Back on Black Records. It was the only album to feature drummer Kvitrafn.

This was the first album on which Infernus was not the main songwriter. Instead, the music for this album was composed by bassist King ov Hell and Kvitrafn. The album cover depicted a burning church, but due to the ensuing controversy, some copies of the album featured a picture of the band members instead.

Track listing

Personnel
 Gaahl – vocals
 Infernus – guitar
 King ov Hell – bass
 Kvitrafn – drums

References

Gorgoroth albums
2003 albums